Speaker of the National Assembly of Kuwait is the presiding officer of the National Assembly of Kuwait.

Timeline

Notes

References

 
Speakers of Kuwait National Assembly